Tell Halula is a large, prehistoric, neolithic tell, about  in size, located around  east of Aleppo and  northwest of Manbij in the Raqqa Governorate of Syria.

Excavation
The tell was first excavated in 1991 by the Spanish Archaeological Mission, directed by Miquel Molist, Professor of Prehistory at the Universitat Autònoma de Barcelona.

Construction
It is situated between Wadi Fars and Wadi Abu Gal Gal on the right bank and fluvial plain of the Euphrates. It is one of the largest neolithic sites yet found, described as a megasite, including the remains of twenty one rectangular houses of three to five rooms, nine with associated burials of at least one hundred and seven incomplete skeletons. Burials were made under the floors of the houses, which were typically covered with a limestone plaster.

Culture
Occupation of the site was detected from the middle of Pre-Pottery Neolithic B (PPNB) at around 7750 BC into the neolithic around 6780 BC and has provided insight into the transitions during this period, especially the emergence of agriculture during the neolithic revolution. Forty levels of occupation have been detected with levels one to twenty dating to the middle PPNB; twenty-one to thirty-four dating to the late PPNB; and two later levels, thirty-six and thirty-seven, showing evidence of the Halaf culture. Various arrowheads were found which were largely classed as Byblos points. Several showed signs of lime plaster around the tangs, which has been suggested to have been the method of fixing to the arrow's shaft. Excavations revealed paintings of female figures on the floor of one of the buildings, which are suggested to be the oldest paintings of people in the Middle East.

Ceramics
The ceramic sequence in Halula begins early in the 7th millennium BC. The introduction of Halaf culture painted Fine Ware is documented for the ‘Halula Phase IV’ period; this took place at the end of 7th millennium. Prior to that, there was the ‘Pre-Halaf’ period covering a very long initial stage of pottery production; the excavators break down this long period as Halula Phases I to III.

Agriculture and animal domestication
222 flint sickle blades were found, including the remains of a complete sickle found in one of the houses made of four blade elements fixed with bitumen, shaped in a curved edge approximately 30 cm in length. Archaeozoological analyses of bovine tooth enamel show the development of herding and management practices of cattle.

D. Helmer suggested that domestication of goats also occurred at this site during the middle PPNB, in a transition from hunting gazelles. Farming of sheep and cattle took place in late middle PPNB stages with a decrease in size of cow noted as a sign of domestication. The prevalence of wild animals also reduced over this period. Analysis of naked emmer wheat and spikelet bases has shown this crop to have been domesticated during the middle of PPNB period at this site. The bottom levels of the tell revealed no evidence of wild crops, which suggests that the first people to occupy the site brought with them fully domesticated forms of wheat, barley and flax, which had been domesticated elsewhere.

Ancient DNA
Eva Fernández Domínguez extracted samples of mitochondrial DNA from human bones from Tell Halula as part of the studies for her PhD thesis accepted at the University of Barcelona in 2005. The methodology used  was later superseded, so a first publication of the results in 2008 was corrected in a subsequent publication in 2014. In the latter publication the mtDNA haplogroups were given as U, R0, K, HV, H, N and L3.

See also

Tell Sabi Abyad

References

External links 
 Syria Ministry of Tourism - JERF EL-AHMAR, TELL HALULA AND THE NORTH SYRIAN ORIGINS OF THE NEOLITHIC by Ms Mandy Mottram
 University of Colgne Radio-carbon context database entry for Tell Halula
 Archaeology -  Oldest Paintings of People in the Middle East, May 27, 1998 by Spencer P.M. Harrington
 Seminari d'Arqueologia Prehistòrica del Pròxim Orient (SAPPO) An Internet portal of Prehistoric Archaeology of the Near East
 Home Page of Misión Arqueológica Espanola el Tell Halula. Valle del medio Eufrates (Syria)

1991 archaeological discoveries
Neolithic settlements
Neolithic sites in Syria
Archaeology of the Near East
Archaeological sites in Aleppo Governorate
Halaf culture
Pre-Pottery Neolithic B